The 2022 Florida gubernatorial election was held on November 8, 2022, to elect the governor of Florida, alongside other state and local elections. Incumbent Republican governor Ron DeSantis won re-election in a landslide and defeated the Democratic nominee, former U.S. representative Charlie Crist, who previously served as governor of Florida from 2007 to 2011 as a Republican. Crist was also an unsuccessful candidate for governor in 2014. He was seeking to become the first Democrat elected governor of Florida since 1994.

According to exit polls, DeSantis won 65% of White voters, 13% of Black voters, and 58% of Latinos; of the latter group, DeSantis won 69% of Cubans and 56% of Puerto Ricans. DeSantis' large margin of victory was in part due to him flipping Democratic stronghold Miami-Dade County for the first time since 2002, and Palm Beach County for the first time since 1986, as well as winning Hillsborough, Osceola, Pinellas, and St. Lucie counties for the first time since 2006; this was also the first gubernatorial election since 2006 in which a candidate received over 50% of the vote. His 19.4% margin of victory was the largest since 1982 and the largest for a Republican since 1868; it was also the first time the governorship was won by double digits since 2002, and the first time it was won by over one million votes. Republicans won the other statewide races by double digits; this is the first time since the end of Reconstruction that Democrats do not hold at least one of the statewide positions. DeSantis also made large gains among Hispanic voters, becoming the first Republican in decades to win a majority of those voters. He also had a major fundraising advantage over Crist, setting an all time record for a gubernatorial candidate.

Some analysts believe that this election may be an indication that Florida has transitioned from being a Republican-leaning swing state into a reliable red state.

Republican primary

Candidates

Nominee
Ron DeSantis, incumbent governor

Failed to qualify 
John Joseph Mercadante, Republican National Committee official and candidate for governor in 2018
Donald J. Peterson, marijuana activist

Declined
Roger Stone, political consultant

Endorsements

Democratic primary

Candidates

Nominee
Charlie Crist, U.S. representative and former Republican governor of Florida

Eliminated in primary
Cadance Daniel, consultant
Nikki Fried, Florida commissioner of agriculture
Robert Lee Willis, teacher and Baptist minister

Failed to qualify
Robert Conner
Ivan Graham, dentist
Jonathan Karns, businessman
Alex Lundmark, real estate agent and candidate for governor in 2018
Christine Powers
Randy Zapata, legal advocate
Carlos Enrique Gutierrez, property manager and candidate for mayor of Miami Beach in 2021

Withdrawn 
 Richard Dembinsky, engineer and candidate for state senate in 2016
Timothy Mosley, charity founder
Annette Taddeo, state senator and nominee for lieutenant governor in 2014 (running for Florida's 27th congressional district) (endorsed Crist)
David Nelson Freeman, businessman

Declined
 Lauren Book, state senator
Randolph Bracy, state senator (running for Florida's 10th congressional district)
Val Demings, U.S. representative (running for U.S. Senate)
Anna Eskamani, state representative
 Dan Gelber, mayor of Miami Beach and former state house minority leader (endorsed Crist)
Andrew Gillum, former mayor of Tallahassee and nominee for governor in 2018
Rebekah Jones, former Florida Department of Health analyst (endorsed Fried)
 Al Lawson, U.S. representative (endorsed Crist)
Stephanie Murphy, U.S. representative
 Jason Pizzo, state senator
Sean Shaw, state representative and nominee for attorney general in 2018 (endorsed Crist)
 Dave Aronberg, Palm Beach County state attorney and former state senator

Endorsements

Polling 
Graphical summary

Results

Running mate selection
In June 2022, Politico released a shortlist of 18 people who Crist was considering as his running mate. On August 26, four days after Crist won the gubernatorial primary, CBS News reported that he had selected Karla Hernández-Mats, one of the people on the Politico shortlist.

Selected
Karla Hernández-Mats, president of the United Teachers of Dade

On shortlist
María Celeste Arrarás, journalist and former Telemundo news anchor
Manny Diaz, chair of the Florida Democratic Party and former mayor of Miami
Fentrice Driskell, state representative and minority leader-designate for the 2024-2026 legislative session
Anna Eskamani, state representative
Anne Gannon, Palm Beach County Tax Collector and former state representative
Dan Gelber, mayor of Miami Beach, former state senator, and nominee for Florida Attorney General in 2010
Jennifer Jenkins, Brevard County school board member
Shevrin Jones, state senator
Al Lawson, U.S. Representative for Florida's 5th congressional district
Amy Mercado, Orange County Property Appraiser and former state representative
Wayne Messam, mayor of Miramar and candidate for president in 2020
Mary Ann Ruiz, attorney
Debbie Mucarsel-Powell, former U.S. Representative for Florida's 26th congressional district
Tina Polsky, state senator
Bobby Powell, state senator
Sean Shaw, former state representative and nominee for Florida Attorney General in 2018
Marie Woodson, state representative

Independent and third-party candidates

Green Party

Withdrawn 

 Brian Moore, activist and perennial candidate (running for state senate)

Independent Party

Withdrawn 

 Gizmo Wexler, IT administrator

Libertarian Party

Declared 
Hector Roos

Declined 
 Roger Stone, political activist and consultant

Independent candidates

Declared 
Carmen Jackie Gimenez

Failed to qualify 
Eugene H. Steele, attorney

Withdrawn 
 Mark B. Graham, computer technician and candidate for president in 2016
Frank Hughes Jr., education consultant
Jodi Gregory Jeloudov

Declined 

 David Jolly, former U.S. representative

Write-ins

Declared 
Piotr Blass, perennial candidate
James Thompson, pastor

General election

Debates and forums

Predictions

Endorsements

Polling
Aggregate polls

Graphical summary

Ron DeSantis vs. Nikki Fried

Ron DeSantis vs. Annette Taddeo

Ron DeSantis vs. generic Democrat

Ron DeSantis vs. Val Demings

Results

Results by county

Voter demographics

See also
 Elections in Florida
 Political party strength in Florida
 Florida Democratic Party
 Florida Republican Party
 Government of Florida
2022 United States Senate election in Florida
 2022 United States House of Representatives elections in Florida
2022 Florida House of Representatives election
 2022 Florida Senate election
 2022 Florida elections
2022 United States gubernatorial elections
 2022 United States elections

Notes

Partisan clients

References

External links 
 Florida Division of Elections Candidate Tracking System
Official campaign websites
 Charlie Crist (D) for Governor
 Ron DeSantis (R) for Governor
 Kyle "KC" Gibson (I) for Governor
 Frank Hughes Jr. (I) for Governor
 Hector Roos (L) for Governor

2022
Florida
Governor
Ron DeSantis